Powditch is a surname. Notable people with the surname include:

Harry Powditch (1894–1963), Australian rules footballer 
William Powditch (1795–1872), British settler and politician in New Zealand